Francisco de Mello (born 14 October 1963) is a Portuguese sailor. He competed in the Star event at the 1992 Summer Olympics.

References

External links
 

1963 births
Living people
Portuguese male sailors (sport)
Olympic sailors of Portugal
Sailors at the 1992 Summer Olympics – Star
Place of birth missing (living people)